A&M may refer to:

Education 
A&M Consolidated High School, a four-year public high school in College Station, Texas

Higher education
Arts et Métiers ParisTech, a French engineering school

Land-grant universities
A&M could refer to any of a number of Agricultural and Mechanical Universities created by the Morrill Land-Grant Acts:
Alabama A&M University
Florida A&M University
Louisiana State University and Agricultural and Mechanical College, commonly referred to as just "Louisiana State University" or "LSU"
Prairie View A&M University
Southern University and A&M College
Texas A&M University, the flagship institution of the Texas A&M University System

Community colleges
Northeastern Oklahoma A&M College

Former Names of Universities 

 Mississippi A&M College, now Mississippi State University
 Oklahoma A&M College, now Oklahoma State University–Stillwater

Companies
Alvarez and Marsal
A&M Records, a record label formed in 1962 by Herb Alpert and Jerry Moss
Arkansas and Missouri Railroad
Atkinson & Marquart Rifle Co., creator of the .475 A&M Magnum American rifle cartridge

Miscellaneous
Hymns Ancient and Modern, the hymnal used in the Church of England

See also

 
 
 
 AM (disambiguation)